Cabel is a surname. Notable people with the surname Cabel include:

Adriaen van der Cabel (1631–1705), Dutch landscape painter
Edmond Cabel (1832–1888), Belgian opera tenor, brother of Marie
Eitan Cabel (born 1959), Israeli politician
Marie Cabel (1827–1885), Belgian opera soprano, sister of Edmond

See also
Arent Arentsz (1585–1631), Dutch landscape painter also known as Cabel
Cabell